Scilla madeirensis is a species of flowering plant in the family Asparagaceae, native to Madeira and the Savage Islands.

The bulbs of the plant have been found to contain 2,4-(4′-aminobenzenamine)pyrimidine, which has limited evidence as a α1-adrenergic receptor antagonist.

References

madeirensis
Flora of Madeira
Flora of the Savage Islands
Plants described in 1926